Ouallam Airport  is an airport serving Ouallam, Niger.

See also
Transport in Niger

References

 OurAirports - Niger
   Great Circle Mapper - Ouallam
 Ouallam Airport
 Google Earth

External links

Airports in Niger